Leonora Colmor Jepsen (born 3 October 1998), also known simply as Leonora, is a Danish singer and former competitive figure skater. As a figure skater, she was a two-time national junior champion in singles in 2015, 2016 and represented her country at the 2016 World Junior Championships. As a singer, she won the 2019 Dansk Melodi Grand Prix and represented Denmark at that year's Eurovision Song Contest in Tel Aviv, finishing 12th with 120 points.

Early life
Born and raised in Hellerup to the north of Copenhagen where she still lives, Leonora received her high school diploma from Gammel Hellerup Gymnasium. She has written many songs of her own, performing in cafés, libraries and small school concerts.

Career
As a figure skater, she competed in the ISU World Junior Championships in 2016 and in the ISU JGP Riga Cup 2015. In December 2016, Leonora and her brother Linus were gold medallists at the Danish figure-skating championships. She had previously been Denmark's junior champion skating solo. She now no longer competes but works as a figure-skating trainer and choreographer.

She represented  in the Eurovision Song Contest 2019 in Tel Aviv with the song "Love Is Forever". She won Danish Melodi Grand Prix 2019 after gaining 42% of the public and jury vote in the superfinal, beating favorites Julie & Nina, and Sigmund. Her song "Love Is Forever", written by Lise Cabble, Melanie Wehbe and Emil Lei, combines four different languages: English, Danish, German and French.

Competitive highlights 
JGP: Junior Grand Prix

Discography

Singles

References

External links

21st-century Danish women singers
1998 births
Living people
Dansk Melodi Grand Prix winners
People from Gentofte Municipality
Danish pop singers
Danish female single skaters
Eurovision Song Contest entrants of 2019
Eurovision Song Contest entrants for Denmark
Spanish-language singers of Denmark